A chakravarti (cakravartin; ; , Zhuǎnlúnwáng, "Wheel-Turning King"; , Zhuǎnlún Shèngwáng, "Wheel-Turning Sacred King"; , Tenrin'ō or , Tenrinjōō) is an ideal (or idealized) universal ruler, in the history, religion, and mythologies of India. The concept is present in the cultural traditions of Vedic, Hindu, Jain and Buddhist narrative myths and lore. There are three types of chakravarti: chakravala chakravarti, a king who rules over all four of the continents (i.e., a universal monarch); dvipa chakravarti, a ruler who governs only one of those continents; and pradesha chakravarti, a monarch who leads the people of only a part of a continent, the equivalent of a local king.  Dvipa chakravarti is particularly one who rules the entire Indian subcontinent (as in the case of the Maurya Empire, despite not conquering the southern kingdoms). The first references to a Chakravala Chakravartin appear in monuments from the time of the early Maurya Empire, in the 4th to 3rd century BCE,  in reference to Chandragupta Maurya and his grandson Ashoka.

The word  is a bahuvrīhi compound word, translating to "one whose wheels are moving", in the sense of "whose chariot is rolling everywhere without obstruction". It can also be analysed as an 'instrumental bahuvrīhi: "through whom the wheel is moving" in the meaning of "through whom the Dharmachakra ("Wheel of the Dharma) is turning" (most commonly used in Buddhism). The Tibetan equivalent   translates "monarch who controls by means of a wheel".

In Buddhism, a chakravarti is the secular counterpart of a buddha. The term applies to temporal as well as spiritual kingship and leadership, particularly in Buddhism and Jainism. In Hinduism, a chakravarti is a powerful ruler whose dominion extends to the entire earth. In both religions, the chakravarti is supposed to uphold dharma, indeed being "he who turns the wheel (of dharma)".

The Indian concept of chakravarti later evolved into the concept of devaraja — the divine right of kings — which was adopted by the Indianised Hindu-Buddhist kingdoms of Southeast Asia through Hindu Brahmin scholars deployed from India to their courts. It was first adopted by Javanese Hindu-Buddhist kingdoms such as Majapahit; through them by the Khmer Empire; and subsequently by the Thai monarchs.

Buddhism
It was believed that once a chakravarti emerged the "Future Buddha" Maitreya would appear on earth.

In early Buddhist art there are more than 30 depictions, all from the Deccan.  In most the Chakravarti King uses the "Royal Gesture" in which the king "clenches his left hand at his chest and reaches up with his right hand".  He is surrounded by his seven attributes: the Chakraratna wheel, his state elephant, charger horse, "the octagonal gem which is so luminous it can light the path of his army by night", his queen, defense minister and finance minister.
 
The early Buddhist Mahāvastu (1.259f) and the Divyāvadāna, as well as the Theravadin Milindapañha, describe the marks of the chakravarti as ruler: , chhatra "parasol", "horn jewel" or vajra, whisk and sandals. These were the marks of the kshatriya. Plastic art of early Mahayana Buddhism illustrates bodhisattvas in a form called  "wearing a turban/hair binding", wielding the mudras for "nonviolent cakravarti rule".

Hinduism 

According to the traditions "Vishnu, in the form of Chakra, was held as the ideal of worship for Kings desirous of obtaining Universal Sovereignty," a concept associated with the Bhagavata Puranas, a religious sanction traceable to the Gupta period, which also led to the Chakravartin Concept. There are relatively few examples of chakravartins in both northern and southern India.

In Southern India, the Pallava period beginning with Simhavishnu (575 CE900 CE) was a transitional stage in southern Indian society with monument building, establishment of (bhakti) sects of Alvars and Nayanars, flowering of rural Brahmanical institutions of Sanskrit learning, and the establishment of Chakravartin model of kingship over a territory of diverse people; which ended the pre-Pallavan era of territorially segmented people, each with their culture, under a tribal chieftain. The Pallava period extolled ranked relationships based on ritual purity as enjoined by the shastras. Burton distinguishes between the Chakravatin model and the Kshatriya model, and likens kshatriyas to locally based warriors with ritual status sufficiently high enough to share with Brahmins; and states that in south India the kshatriya model did not emerge. As per Burton, South India was aware of the Indo-Aryan Varna organized society in which decisive secular authority was vested in the Kshatriyas; but apart from the Pallava, Chola and Vijayanagar line of warriors which claimed Chakravartin status, only few locality warrior families achieved the prestigious kin-linked organization of northern warrior groups.

Jainism

During the each motion of the half-cycle of the wheel of time, 63 Salakapurusa or 63 illustrious men, consisting of the 12 Chakravartin regularly appear. The Jain cosmology or legendary history is basically a compilation of the deeds of these illustrious men. As per Jain cosmology, Chakravartins are Universal Monarchs or World Conquerors. Golden in complexion, they all belonged to the Kasyapa gotra. The mother of a Chakravartin sees some dreams at the time of conception. A chakravartin is considered an ideal human being endowed with thirty-two major signs of excellence and many minor signs of excellence.

The list of 12 chakravartin of Avasarpini as per Jainism is as follows

Bharata, son of Tirthankara Rishabhanatha
Sagara, ancestor of Bhagiratha as in the Puranas
 Maghava
Sanatkumara
 
Tirthankara Shantinatha
Tirthankara Kunthunatha
Tirthankara Aranatha
 Subhauma
Padmanabha
Harishena
 Jayasena
 Brahmadatt

In Jainism, a Chakravartin Samrat was characterised by his possession of Saptaratna, or "Seven Jewels":
Ratna-Chakra, a miraculous diamond serrated discus that never misses its target
Empress
Divine Jewellery
Immense Wealth
Huge Army of War-Chariots
Huge Army of Cavalry
Huge Army of Elephants

Some lists cite navaratna or "nine jewels" instead, adding "Prime Minister" and "Son".

See also

Similar Indic concepts
Chakraborty
Chhatrapati
Devaraja
Kalachakra
Maharaja 
Rajamandala 
Samraat

Generic similar concepts
Philosopher king
Solar chariot 
Universal monarchy
King of the Universe

Spread and evolution of Chakravarti concept beyond India
Greater India 
kingdoms of Southeast Asia 
Indianisation

References

Citations

Sources

Dictionary of Hindu Lore and Legend by Anna Dallapiccola
Cakkavatti Sutta The Wheel-turning Emperor (excerpt) Translated from the Pali by Thanissaro Bhikkhu
A Glossary of Pali and Buddhist Terms

Titles and occupations in Hinduism
Buddhist mythology
Buddhist philosophical concepts
Buddhist titles
Jain religious occupations
Salakapurusa
Royal titles
Titles in India
Superlatives in religion
Emperors
Hinduism and government
Buddhism and government
Jainism and government